Union Station (also called Brattleboro station) is an Amtrak intercity rail station located in downtown Brattleboro, Vermont, United States. It is served by the one daily round trip of the Vermonter service. Most of the 1915-built station is occupied by the 1972-opened Brattleboro Museum and Art Center, while Amtrak uses a waiting room on the lower floor. The building was added to the National Register of Historic Places in 1974.

History

Early stations and Union Station

The Vermont and Massachusetts Railroad opened from the state line at East Northfield, Massachusetts/South Vernon, Vermont to Brattleboro on February 20, 1849. The three lines became part of the Central Vermont Railway (CV) in 1873. The first Brattleboro station was a long single-story wooden building, no longer extant.

The Brattleboro and Whitehall Railroad, a CV subsidiary, opened to South Londonberry, Vermont in 1880. A two-story Queen Anne style brick station was built that year to replace the original station. It was taken over by the Boston and Maine Railroad (B&M) in 1893. The B&M opened the Fort Hill Branch of its subsidiary Ashuelot Railroad between Brattleboro and South Vernon in 1913; it was operated as a second track of the existing CV mainline.

The CV and B&M jointly constructed a union station at Brattleboro in 1915. Built at a cost of $75,000, it was made of quartzite quarried across the river at Wantastiquet Mountain. It was built into a bluff overlooking the Connecticut River, with the first story at track level and the third story facing the street. A footbridge crossed the tracks to reach the northbound platform.

Decline and revival

CV passenger service to South Londonberry ended in 1927 and resumed briefly in 1931. It was operated intermittently by a local man from 1933 to 1935; the line was abandoned in 1938. CV/B&M passenger service to Brattleboro ended in September 1966 with the termination of the Montrealer. The Fort Hill Branch was discontinued as a through route in 1970 and abandoned in 1983. In 1972, the town purchased the disused Union Station building for $27,500; it was converted to the Brattleboro Museum and Art Center, which opened that year.

Amtrak, which took over intercity passenger rail service in the United States in 1971, began operation of the overnight Montrealer on September 30, 1972. Brattleboro was a stop for the Montrealer from its inception, though a ticket office and waiting room did not open in the lower level of the Union Station building until 1973. Union Station was added to the National Register of Historic Places in 1974. The Montealer was suspended from 1987 to 1989, then replaced by the daytime Vermonter in 1995. A two-phase project planned in the late 1990s was to include a new train station; the first-phase garage and bus station opened downtown in 2003, but the second-phase station was not built.

New station plans

Amtrak and the town announced plans in 2020 to build an accessible full-length high-level platform – the first such platform in the state. Construction on the $4.5 million project is planned to start in early 2022, with completion in 2023. A $366,000 expansion of the parking area, which involves demolition of the nearby Archery Building, is planned to be complete in late 2021 ahead of the station project. The Archery Building, a small wooden structure across the tracks from the station building, may have originally been a freight house or railroad office; contrary to local claims, it was not the original passenger station.

The building is leased to the museum by the town for $1 per year. Because it does not own the structure, the museum is not able to raise money to repair the building. In 2018, the museum requested that the town sell the building to the museum to allow fundraising. In October 2021, the town proposed to transfer ownership of the station building to the museum for $1, contingent on Amtrak vacating its portion by mid-2024. The new station will include artwork from the Brattleboro Words Project.

References

Further reading

External links

Brattleboro Amtrak Station (USA Rail Guide -- Train Web)
Brattleboro Museum and Art Center

Amtrak stations in Vermont
Buildings and structures in Brattleboro, Vermont
Transportation buildings and structures in Windham County, Vermont
National Register of Historic Places in Windham County, Vermont
Stations along Boston and Maine Railroad lines
Former Central Vermont Railway stations
Brattleboro, Vermont
Railway stations on the National Register of Historic Places in Vermont
Railway stations in the United States opened in 1915
Railway stations closed in 1966
Railway stations in the United States opened in 1972
Railway stations closed in 1987
Railway stations in the United States opened in 1989